Lake Lakhta (Russian: Лахтинский разлив; Lakhtinsky razliv; from Finnish lahti, 'gulf') is a lake (or inlet) in St. Petersburg's Primorsky District connected to the Neva Bay of the Baltic Sea by the 500-meter-long Bobylka River.

The Kamenka, Glukharka and Yuntolovka rivers empty into the lake. Its area is 1.76 km², with the maximum depth of 8.3 meters. The lakeside village of Lakhta takes its name from the lake. Along the eastern shore extends the neighbourhood of Kolomäki.

The lake belongs to the Yuntolovsky Reserve, zakaznik established in 1999 to conserve the nature of the nearby wetlands, providing, among other things, habitat for a significant population of the shrub Myrica gale, which is protected in Russia.

See also 
 Lakhtinsky crossover
 Lakhta-Olgino Municipal Okrug

Lakes of Saint Petersburg
Bays of the Baltic Sea
Bays of Russia
Primorsky District, Saint Petersburg